Exposition Park is a neighborhood in the south region of Los Angeles, California. It is home to Exposition Park, which includes the Los Angeles Memorial Coliseum, Banc of California Stadium, Exposition Rose Garden and three museums: the California African American Museum, the California Science Center and the Natural History Museum of Los Angeles County. It is also home to a Science Center Academy.

Geography

According to the Mapping L.A. project of the Los Angeles Times, The Exposition Park 1.85-square-mile neighborhood is flanked by Adams-Normandie on the north, University Park on the northeast, Historic South Central on the east, Vermont Square on the south, and Jefferson Park and Leimert Park on the west. It is bounded by Jefferson Boulevard on the north, Vermont Avenue on the east, Martin Luther King Jr. Boulevard on the south and Arlington Avenue on the west, to which is added all of Exposition Park and additional land along both sides of Figueroa Street east and Exit 20A of the  Interstate 110 Freeway.

Population

A total of 31,062 residents counted in its 1.85 square miles, which is including the park land as well as Los Angeles Memorial Coliseum  according to the 2000 U.S. census—an average of 16,819 people per square mile among the highest population densities for both the city and the county. By 2008 the population had increased to 33,458, the city has estimated.

The median age was 26, considered young for both the city and the county, and the percentages of residents aged birth through 18 were among the county's highest. There were 1,818 families headed by single parents; the rate of 27.3% was considered high for both the city and the county.

Within the neighborhood, Latinos made up 36.9% of the population, while  African American were at 38.1%— both considered high percentages for the county. Other ethnicities were White, 2.2%; Asian, 1.6%; and other, 2%. Mexico and El Salvador were the most common places of birth for the 38.5% of the residents who were born abroad, an average percentage of foreign-born when compared with the city as a whole.

The median household income in 2008 dollars was $33,999, considered low for both the city and county. The percentage of households earning $20,000 or less was high, compared to the county at large. The average household size of 3.3 people was about the same as in the city at large. Renters occupied 69% of the housing units, and homeowners occupied the rest. The percentages of never-married people were among the county's highest—45.5% for men and 39.1% for women.

Education

Only 7.3% of the neighborhood residents aged 25 and older had a four-year degree, a low percentage for both the city and the county. The percentage of residents of that age with less than a high school diploma was also high (the total number being 8,603, compared with 8,213 with more education).

The schools operating with the Exposition Park neighborhood boundaries are:

 Alliance College-Ready Academy High No. 5 (LAUSD, charter), 1729 West Martin Luther King Jr. Boulevard
 Foshay Learning Center (LAUSD, K-12), 3751 South Harvard Boulevard
 Thurgood Marshall Charter Middle School (LAUSD), 3200 West Adams Boulevard
 Lenicia B. Weemes Elementary School (LAUSD), 1260 West 36th Place
 Dr. Theo T. Alexander Jr. Science Center (LAUSD, charter elementary), 3737 S. Figueroa Street, within Exposition Park, the school first opened on September 9, 2004
 Martin Luther King Jr. Elementary School, (LAUSD), 3989 South Hobart Street

Transportation
Three Metro E Line stations are located within the Exposition Park neighborhood: 

 Expo Park/USC station 
 Vermont station 
 Western station

Olympic Games
Two Olympic Games were held at various venues within Exposition Park; the 1932 Summer Olympics and the 1984 Summer Olympics.

Recreation and parks

 Exposition Park (Los Angeles)
 Denker Recreation Center, 1550 West 35th Place
 Martin Luther King Jr. Park, 3916 South Western Avenue

Notable people

Jackie Robinson, Hall of Fame and pioneer athlete
Bill Robinson, American tap dancer and actor
Betty Hill, activist
Loren Miller, Los Angeles County attorney and judge
Eric Dolphy, jazz musician 
William J. Powell, aviator
Reb Spikes, jazz musician 
Ramon Novarro, actor 
Noble Johnson, actor, film producer

See also

 List of districts and neighborhoods in Los Angeles
 List of parks in Los Angeles

References

External links
 Neighborhood Spotlight: Exposition Park's sports, culture and transit offerings make it a player to watch
 Expo Center website, Los Angeles Department of Recreation and Parks
 North Area Neighborhood Council
 Exposition Park neighborhood crime map and statistics

 
Parks in Los Angeles
Neighborhoods in Los Angeles
Municipal parks in California
Venues of the 1932 Summer Olympics 
South Los Angeles